Mikulovice may refer to places in the Czech Republic:

Mikulovice (Jeseník District), a municipality and village in the Olomouc Region
Mikulovice (Pardubice District), a municipality and village in the Pardubice Region
Mikulovice (Třebíč District), a municipality and village in the Vysočina Region
Mikulovice (Znojmo District), a market town in the South Moravian Region